The American television police procedural and legal drama Law & Order (1990–2010, 2022–present) follows the cases of a group of police detectives and prosecutors who represent the public interest in the criminal justice system. Known for its revolving cast, most of the original stars had left the show within the first five seasons; though Dann Florek reprised his role of Capt. Donald Cragen on the spin-off series Law & Order: Special Victims Unit from 1999 to 2014, and Chris Noth reprised his role of Det. Mike Logan on Law & Order: Criminal Intent from 2005 to 2008. The longest-serving main cast members of the original series include Steven Hill as D.A. Adam Schiff (1990–2000), Jerry Orbach as Det. Lennie Briscoe (1992–2004), S. Epatha Merkerson as Lt. Anita Van Buren (1993–2010), Sam Waterston as EADA/DA Jack McCoy (1994–2010, 2022) and Jesse L. Martin as Det. Ed Green (1999–2008). Long-running recurring cast members on the series include John Fiore as Det. Tony Profaci (1990–1998), Carolyn McCormick as Dr. Elizabeth Olivet (1991–2009), Leslie Hendrix as Dr. Elizabeth Rodgers (1992–2010) and J. K. Simmons as Dr. Emil Skoda (1997–2010).

Characters

Main characters

Police officers

Sergeants

Senior detectives

Junior detectives

Supervising officers

Prosecutors

Executive Assistant District Attorneys

Assistant District Attorneys

In the 1997 season 7 episode "We Like Mike", Caleb Duff is listed as Assistant District Attorney beneath Adam Schiff as District Attorney and John J. McCoy as Executive Assistant District Attorney at the New York County District Attorney's Office, though he never appears on screen.

Manhattan District Attorneys

Other main characters

Recurring characters

NYPD personnel

NYPD officials

27th Precinct support detectives

Crime Scene Unit investigators / crime lab technicians

Assistant Medical Examiners

Defense attorneys

Judges

Arraignment judges

Trial judges

Appellate judges

Guest characters

Defense attorneys

See also
 Law & Order (franchise)
 List of Law & Order: Special Victims Unit characters
 List of Law & Order: Criminal Intent characters
 List of Law & Order: LA characters

References

 
Law & Order (franchise)
Lists of American crime television series characters
Lists of American drama television series characters